Touzac may refer to the following places in France:

 Touzac, Charente, a commune in the Charente department
 Touzac, Lot, a commune in the Lot department